"Everytime You Need Me" is a song by German trance group Fragma featuring English singer Maria Rubia. It was released in January 2001 as the third single from their debut album, Toca (2001). The single peaked at number three on the UK Singles Chart and in Finland while also becoming a top-10 hit in Ireland and Norway.

The song was remade in 2011 (titled "Everytime You Need Me 2011") with a new instrumental featuring vocals from Damae and new remixes.

Track listings

 German CD single
 "Everytime You Need Me" (radio edit) – 3:30
 "Everytime You Need Me" (extended version) – 5:15

 German 12-inch single
A1. "Everytime You Need Me" (extended version) – 5:15
A2. "Everytime You Need Me" (Pulsedriver remix) – 7:20
B1. "Everytime You Need Me" (Jam X & De Leon's Dumonde remix) – 7:49

 European maxi-CD single
 "Everytime You Need Me" (radio edit) – 3:30
 "Everytime You Need Me" (extended version) – 5:15
 "Everytime You Need Me" (Pulsedriver remix) – 7:20
 "Everytime You Need Me" (Jam X & De Leon's Dumonde remix) – 7:49

 UK CD1
 "Everytime You Need Me" (radio edit) – 3:30
 "Everytime You Need Me" (Pulsedriver vocal remix) – 7:25
 "Everytime You Need Me" (Above & Beyond remix) – 8:37
 "Everytime You Need Me" (enhanced video)

 UK CD2
 "Everytime You Need Me" (extended version) – 5:15
 "Toca's Miracle" (Life of Riley remix) – 6:48
 "Toca's Miracle" (DJ Garry's 2001 Mix) – 4:13

 US maxi-CD single
 "Everytime You Need Me" (radio edit)
 "Everytime You Need Me" (extended mix)
 "Everytime You Need Me" (Above & Beyond remix)
 "Everytime You Need Me" (Pulsedriver mix)
 "Everytime You Need Me" (Jam X & De Leon's Dumonde remix)

 Australian CD single
 "Everytime You Need Me" (radio edit) – 3:30
 "Everytime You Need Me" (Pulsedriver edit) – 2:50
 "Everytime You Need Me" (extended version) – 5:15
 "Everytime You Need Me" (Pulsedriver remix) – 7:20
 "Everytime You Need Me" (Jam X & De Leon's Dumonde remix) – 7:49

Charts

Weekly charts

Year-end charts

Certifications

Release history

References

2001 singles
2001 songs
Edel AG singles
Jive Records singles
Number-one singles in Scotland
Positiva Records singles
Songs written by Ramon Zenker